The 2008 American Basketball Association All-Star Game was held at the 1,856 seat Barre Auditorium in Barre, Vermont on March 21–22, 2008, where East defeated West in style, 161–140 in front of 1,500 basketball fans. Anthony Anderson of the Manchester Millrats won the MVP award. Senegalese player Issa Konare and Chinese Sun Yue were the only foreigners of the All-Star Game.

The 2008 ABA All-Star Game events

The Three-Point contest
The night before the All-Star Game on March, in the opening event of the 2008 ABA All-Star Weekend, Robin Kennedy of the Orange County Gladiators, an And1 Tour veteran, nosed out guard Sean Dixon of the Atlanta Vision to win the Simply Subs ABA Three-Point crown. Antonio Burks, Kenny Wright also participated in the contest but failed to qualify to the final.

The Slam-Dunk contest
Chris Cayole of the Vermont Frost Heaves playing in front of his home crowd, won the M&M Beverage Centers Slam-Dunk title, thanks to a 360-degree windmill jam which ultimately earned him the dunk title over Cardell Butler of the San Diego Wildcats and Mario Kinsey of the Texas Tycoons at the Barre Auditorium on Friday, March 21.

All-Star Teams

Rosters

See also
2006 ABA All-Star Game
2007 ABA All-Star Game
2011 ABA All-Star Game

References

External links
ABALive.com/AllStar – Official website of the 2008 ABA All-Star Game

ABA All-Star Games
2007–08 in American basketball